The Forbin class was a group of three protected cruisers built for the French Navy in the late 1880s and early 1890s. The Forbin-class cruisers were intended to serve as flotilla leaders for the torpedo boats, and they were armed with a main battery of four  guns.

Forbin spent most of her career in the Mediterranean in the Reserve Squadron, while Surcouf served in the Northern Squadron in the English Channel. Coëtlogon suffered from machinery problems that significantly delayed her completion, and after finally entering service in 1894, joined Surcouf in the Northern Squadron. All three ships were in reserve by 1901. Coëtlogon was discarded in 1906, while Forbin was converted into a collier in 1913. Surcouf was the only member of the class still in active service during World War I, and she was deployed later in the conflict to the Gulf of Guinea. Forbin was scrapped in 1919 and Surcouf was sold to ship breakers two years later.

Design

The naval engineer Louis-Émile Bertin had advocated for just such a vessel since 1875, and his design became the cruiser . Bertin's design would eventually be developed into the Forbin-type of protected cruisers.

In the early 1880s, the  doctrine, which envisioned using a combination of cruisers and torpedo boats to defend France and attack enemy merchant shipping, became popular in French naval circles. He requested on 1 February 1886 just such a vessel from Marie de Bussy, the Inspector General of Naval Engineering. Over the following month, de Bussy prepared a more detailed design based on these specifications, which Aube approved on 20 March. Three of the vessels were allocated to the 1887 budget, which included a number of other cruisers, all of which were part of Aube's program to equip the French fleet with a number of commerce raiders.

The first two vessels of the 1887 budget— and —were built in government shipyards according to de Bussy's plans, but for the third vessel, he issued the requirements prepared in February to private shipyards for competing designs. By this time, an extraordinary budget was passed for 1887 that included three more small cruisers. One of these, was ordered to de Bussy's design, while the other two became Troude-class cruisers. As work on the Forbin-class ships progressed, the design was altered. The ships were intended to have five torpedo tubes, but on 23 June 1887, the fifth tube, which was to have been placed in the stern, was deleted. Forbin was completed in 1888 with the original armament, but just two main battery guns was found to be insufficient, particularly compared to foreign counterparts, and so another pair of guns was added before Forbin entered active service and the other two vessels were completed.

Characteristics

They displaced  as completed. Their hulls had a tumblehome shape and featured a pronounced ram bow, though it was not actually intended to be used for ramming attacks. The ships' superstructure was minimal, consisting primarily of a small bridge structure. Their crew amounted to 209 officers and enlisted men.

The ship's propulsion system consisted of a pair of horizontal, 2-cylinder compound steam engines driving two screw propellers. Steam was provided by six coal-burning fire-tube boilers that were ducted into two funnels. To supplement the steam engines on long voyages overseas, the ships were originally design with a four-masted schooner rig; Forbin was completed that way, but the sails proved to have limited use during her trials, so she was converted to a three-masted schooner rig. The other two ships were modified during construction to match.

The ships were armed with a main battery of four  30-caliber M1881 guns in individual pivot mounts, all in sponsons in the upper deck, with two guns per broadside. Forbin was originally completed with just two of the guns, but had the remaining pair installed during her trials period. The sponsons proved to be weakly constructed and were susceptible to damage from heavy seas, though Coëtlogons were better than the other two ships'. For close-range defense against torpedo boats, they carried three  M1885 3-pounder Hotchkiss guns and four  1-pounder Hotchkiss revolver cannon. They were also armed with four  torpedo tubes in her hull above the waterline. Two tubes were in the bow and the other two were on the side of the hull, one per broadside. The ships had provisions to carry up to 150 naval mines.

The deck was wrought iron that sloped down at the sides to provide a measure of vertical protection. Above the deck, a layer of highly sub-divided watertight compartments was added to control flooding in the event of battle damage. Below the deck and above the engine and boiler rooms was a  anti-splinter deck to protect the machinery from shell fragments. All of the guns were initially fitted with gun shields.

Modifications

The members of the class underwent repeated and differing refits over the course of their careers. Almost immediately after entering service, all three ships had an armored conning tower installed between 1889 and 1890. Forbins conning tower had  sides, while the other two ships received 40 mm plating on their towers. Between 1890 and 1893, all three ships received updates to their armament, and all three ships had their rigging altered. Forbin and Coëtlogon had their main mast removed, along with their pole bowsprit; their fore and mizzenmasts were moved closer together. Surcouf only lost her mainmast during that refit. By the time work was completed, all three ships had quick-firing guns for their main battery, and two 47 mm guns were added in exchange for the removal of one of the 37 mm guns. The main guns aboard Forbin were simply converted to quick firing, while Surcouf received the updated M1884 variant, which was also quick firing. Whether Coëtlogons guns were simply upgraded or replaced is not recorded.

In 1895, the navy ordered that the bow torpedo tubes be removed from all three ships, and the work was carried out the following year. At the same time, the gun shields for the 47 mm and 37 mm guns were removed. Another major refit was carried out between 1905 and 1906. The remaining sailing rigs were removed from all three ships, and the armament was revised again. Forbin retained her main battery, but her light guns were standardized to nine 47 mm guns. Surcouf was the same, though she carried just seven of the 47 guns. Both ships kept a pair of 37 mm guns for their boats. Coëtlogon, which had been decommissioned in 1905, was not updated. All three ships had their remaining torpedo tubes removed at that time. At some point during their careers, Forbin and Surcouf had their boilers modified to accept mixed coal and oil fuel. 

In 1916, Surcouf, the sole remaining member of the class still in active service, received two 47 mm anti-aircraft guns on her forward upper deck. After being reduced to a hulk in August 1917, she was disarmed. The following year, Forbin was converted into a replenishment hulk. Her propulsion system was removed to open space for a coal storage hold capable of carrying  of coal. Eight cranes were installed to transfer coal to other vessels.

Construction
Coëtlogon had serious problems with her propulsion system, which significantly delayed her completion. She began sea trials in 1891 that revealed the defects and led to a complete replacement of the engines. The new engines also had problems, including severe vibration, and Coëtlogon was finally able to complete her trials and enter fleet service in 1895.

Service history

Forbin was initially placed in the Mediterranean Squadron, before later being transferred to the Reserve Squadron, where she was activated periodically to participate in training exercises with the ships of the Mediterranean Squadron. Surcouf was assigned to the Northern Squadron in the English Channel; Coëtlogon joined her there after finally entering service in 1895. During this period, the ships were primarily occupied with training exercises; during one set of maneuvers in 1894, Forbin had to tow a torpedo boat back to port after it was damaged in a collision with another vessel. Surcouf was placed in the 2nd category of reserve in 1896, but she was reactivated the following year for exercises with the Northern Squadron. Coëtlogon served with the Northern Squadron until August 1896, when she was placed in reserve in Lorient; she saw no further active service.

Surcouf remained in service with the Northern Squadron through 1899. All three ships were reduced to reserve by 1901. That year, Forbin suffered an ammunition fire that resulted from unstable  charges. In 1902, Surcouf was deployed to East Asia, and she returned to France by 1904 for another stint with the Northern Squadron. She remained there through 1908. Coëtlogon, which was not a successful vessel, was decommissioned in June 1905, struck from the naval register in August, sold to be broken up in August 1906.

Forbin was reactivated in 1906 for service in the Northern Squadron. Forbin had been moved to the Moroccan Naval Division in 1911 and was converted into a collier two years later. In 1916 during World War I, Surcouf was sent to the Gulf of Guinea to patrol for German vessels, remaining there until the end of the war. While there, she landed some of her light guns to strengthen forces ashore. Forbin was converted into a coal storage hulk for the main French fleet at Corfu, while Surcouf was used as a support hulk for a submarine squadron based at Gibraltar from 1917. Forbin was towed to Piraeus, Greece, after the war in 1919 to be scrapped there, and Surcouf was broken up at Rochefort in 1921.

Notes

References

 
 
 
 
 
 
 
 
 
 
 
 
 
 
 
 
 
 
 

 
Cruiser classes
Ships built in France
Ship classes of the French Navy